Plantin premetro station is an Antwerp premetro station. Located under the intersection of Simonsstraat with the Plantin en Moretuslei, it is served by lines 2, 6, 9 and 15.

Opened in 1980, the station reflects the 'richer' period of the MIVA - the Antwerp transport company which was later merged into De Lijn - and is decorated in marble. The layout consists of three levels, of which the first (-1) contains a ticket hall and four exits towards street level (corresponding to the intersection under which it lies). Level -2 comprises the platform serving northbound trains to Diamant, whilst Level -3 comprises the southbound platform towards the premetro tunnel exits at the Belgiëlei, used by routes 2, 6 and 15, and Mercatorstraat, used by route 9.

See also
 Trams in Antwerp

Antwerp Premetro
Railway stations opened in 1980
1980 establishments in Belgium